Spacetoon is an international TV network. This is a list of television programs broadcast by Spacetoon around the world.

Spacetoon Arabic

Current and former programming
10+2 (7 August 2003 – 30 March 2019; 2020) (Bon Bon)
Ace Ventura Pet Detective (2000–2013) (Comedy)
Adventures From The Book of Virtues (10 April – 3 November 2006) (Adventure)
The Adventures of Sam & Max: Freelance Police (5 January 2005 – 6 May 2006) (Adventure)
The Adventures of Tom Sawyer (2015–2019) (Adventure)
The Adventures of Paddington (TBA 2023) (Adventure)
Adventures of Sonic the Hedgehog (23 July 2000 – 31 January 2015) (Adventure, Comedy from 2013 onwards)
Aesop World (30 June 2004 – 31 May 2020) (Bon Bon)
Akakage (Action)
Akubi-chan (2 May 2006 – 8 October 2017) (Zomoroda)
ALF: The Animated Series (27 June 2003 – 18 December 2013) (Adventure)
All-New Dennis the Menace (24 June 2000 – 22 February 2013) (Comedy)
The All New Popeye Hour (2000 – 22 February 2012) (Adventure)
Alpen Rose (2000–2018) (Zomoroda)
ALVINNN!!! and the Chipmunks (2016–2020; 2022–present) (Comedy)
Anatole (30 June 2004 – 28 January 2014) (Bon Bon)
Andy Pandy (10 February 2007 – 30 July 2018)  (Bon Bon)
Animaniacs (1 August 2001 – 14 December 2011) (Comedy)
Animated Hero Classics (10 April – 3 November 2006) (History)
Anyamaru Tantei Kiruminzuu (Zomoroda)
Aoki Densetsu Shoot! (2000 – 31 October 2013) (Sports)
Arabian Nights: Sinbad's Adventures (2000–2014) (Adventure)
Argai: The Prophecy (2003–2013) (Action)
Ashita he Free Kick (2000 – 31 October 2013) (Sports)
Attack of Captain Constant (2000 – 31 October 2013) (Sports)
B-Daman Crossfire (2014–2016) (Action)
Babar (25 July 2000 – 23 February 2015) (Bon Bon)
Babar and the Adventures of Badou (2015–2018) (Bon Bon)
Baby & Me (12 June 2000 – 12 September 2016) (Adventure)
Baby Looney Tunes (15 February 2006 – 18 March 2011) (Comedy)
Bakugan Battle Brawlers (2009–2014) (Action)
Bakusō Kyōdai Let's & Go!! (2002 – 31 October 2013) (Sports)
Bakusō Kyōdai Let's & Go!! Max (2009 – 31 October 2013) (Sports)
Barbie Dreamtopia (30 November 2020 – present) (Zomoroda)
Barney & Friends (3 April 2000 – 1 January 2011) (Abjad)
Bartok the Magnificent (Movies)
Batman: The Animated Series (15 July 2000 – 31 January 2013) (Action)
Ben 10 (8 June – 18 December 2008) (Action)
Beyblade (14 March 2004 – 21 October 2016) (Sports)
Beyblade Burst (10 December 2018 – present) (Sports)
Bi-Legend Battle Bidaman (2007–2010) (Action)
Biker Mice from Mars (2006) (2008) (Action)
Birdz (15 June 2003 – 16 November 2013) (Comedy)
Bjorn And Bucky Be Be Bears (6 September 2020 – present) (Adventure)
The Black Corsair (2003–2008) (Adventure)
Blazing Dragons (11 June 2001 – 18 March 2014) (Comedy)
Blazing Team: Masters of Yo Kwon Do (17 November 2019 – present) (Action)
Blazing Teens (18 February 2008 – 12 November 2013) (Action)
Bob the Builder (2016–2021) (Bon Bon)
Bob the Builder: Mega Machines – The Movie (22 January 2021) (Movies)
Bob the Builder: Ready, Steady, Build! (Bon Bon)
Bomberman B-Daman Bakugaiden (2001–2005) (Action)
Bruno the Kid (11 September 2000 – 10 May 2008) (Adventure)
Bump in the Night (15 May 2004 – 25 September 2014) (Comedy)
Burst Ball Barrage !! Super B-Daman (2006–2007) (Action)
Caillou (18 March 2018 – present) (Bon Bon)
Camp Candy (15 June 2002 – 10 May 2014) (Adventure)
Canimals (20 July – 20 October 2012) (Adventure)
Captain Majid (27 March 2000 – 27 September 2016) (Sports)
Captain Power and the Soldiers of the Future (2001 – 31 October 2014) (Action)
Captain Simian & the Space Monkeys (2001–2003) (Action)
Captain Tsubasa (27 March 2000 – 27 September 2016) (Sports)
The Care Bears Family (30 March 2004 – 29 March 2014) (Bon Bon)
Cartooning with Blitz (15 June 2001 – 28 October 2014) (Abjad)
Casper's Scare School (25 October 2011 – 31 March 2015) (Comedy)
Charley and Mimmo (29 March 2005 – 6 September 2017; 2019) (Bon Bon)
China Wings (2003–2005) (Action)
Christopher Columbus (2000–2005) (History)
Chouseishin Gransazer (2006–2012) (Action)
Clamp School Detectives (2007–2014) (Adventure)
Codename: Kids Next Door (13 March 2009 – 12 March 2010) (Comedy)
Cookin' Idol I! My! Mine! (8 June 2014 – 2017) (Zomoroda)
Cook and Sheep (3 March 2013 – 5 April 2015; 6 October 2017 – 2018) (Comedy)
Crash B-Daman (2010–2014) (Action)
Cyborg Kuro-chan (29 January 2006 – 29 September 2020) (Adventure)
Dash! Yonkuro (2000–2013) (Sports)
Delfy and His Friends  (Adventure)
Dennō Bōkenki Webdiver (2005–2016) (Action)
Detective Conan (31 March 2000 – present) (Action)
Dexter's Laboratory (23 July 2004 – 11 April 2008) (Comedy)
D.I.C.E. (29 January 2006 – 29 September 2020) (Action)
Dig & Dug with Daisy (4 August 2001 – 24 July 2019, 2020) (Bon Bon)
Digimon Adventure 02 (15 April 2002 – 30 September 2014) (Action)
Digimon Adventure (15 April 2001 – 30 September 2014) (Action)
Digimon Frontier (15 April 2004 – 30 September 2014) (Action)
Digimon Tamers (15 April 2003 – 30 September 2014) (Action)
Dog of Flanders (Movies)
Doraemon (1979) (21 August 2000 – 30 June 2008) (Bon Bon)
Doraemon (2005) (4 April 2016 – 2020) (Comedy)
Double Dragon (2000–2011) (Action)
Dragon Ball (2002 – 30 November 2008) (Action)
Dragon Ball Super (15 March 2020 – present) (Action)
Dragon Ball Z (2003 – 31 March 2013) (Action)
Dragon Ball Z Kai (2015) (Action)
Dragon Booster (12 January 2005 – 20 May 2008) (Action)
Dragon Quest (31 March 2000 – 24 July 2007) (Action)
Droopy, Master Detective (2000–2004) (Comedy)
Dumb and Dumber (Comedy)
Edebits (Adventure)
Emily of New Moon (2010–2016) (Zomoroda)
Enchantimals: Finding Home (23 April 2021) (Movies)
Enchantimals: Tales from Everwilde (Season 1: 7 September 2020 – 3 April 2021; 1 June – 6 July 2021) (Season 2: 19 September 2021 – 2022) (Zomoroda)
Enchantimals: Secrets of Snowy Valley (13 May 2021) (Movies)
Enchantimals: Spring Into Harvest Hills (18 June 2021) (Movies)
Everything's Rosie (2015–2017) (Adventure)
Exosquad (Action)
F (20 January 2009 – 20 January 2017) (Action)
Fabulous Funnies (31 March 2000 – 26 October 2013) (Comedy)
The Fairly OddParents (2016–2019) (Comedy)
The Fantastic Voyages of Sinbad the Sailor (2001–2012) (Adventure)
Fifi and the Flowertots (8 July 2006 – 16 December 2016) (Zomoroda)
Fimbles (1 April 2005 – 31 March 2015) (Abjad)
Fireman Sam (2016–2019) (Bon Bon)
Fireman Sam: Alien Alert! The Movie (11 December 2020) (Movies)
First Flight (Movies)
The Fixies (Science)
The Flintstones (13 June 2000 – 18 October 2014) (Comedy)
Floral Magician Mary Bell (2000–2013) (Zomoroda)
Foofur (13 August 2003 – 8 September 2014) (Adventure)
Franklin (3 May 2003 – 23 February 2015) (Bon Bon)
Franklin and Friends (2015–2017) (Bon Bon)
Fushigi Yugi (2011–2020) (Adventure)
Futurama (14 February – 26 October 2011) (Comedy)
Future Boy Conan (1 September 2000 – 15 February 2015) (History then Adventure in 2013)
Garfield and Friends (Garfield segments only) (24 June 2007 – 11 December 2013 (Adventure)
Garfield Gets Real (Movies)
Gekito! Crush Gear Turbo (12 January 2005 – 18 December 2013) (Sports)
George and Martha (29 March 2005 – 31 May 2020) (Bon Bon)
Ginga Sengoku Gun'yūden Rai (2000–2013) (Action)
Golden Warrior Gold Lightan (2006–2015) (Action)
Gormiti: The Lords Of Nature Return! (2011–2014) (Action)
Gormiti (2019–2021) (Action)
Grander Musashi (2003 – 24 September 2017) (Adventure)
Granesizer (2006–2012) (Action)
The Great Adventures of Robin Hood (3 June 2000 – 1 March 2015) (History then Adventure in 2013)
The Great Book of Nature (18 March 2003 – 14 May 2008) (Adventure)
Grimm's Fairy Tale Classics (2000 – 21 December 2016) (Movies then Adventure in 2013)
Grendizer (2015–2017) (Action)
Gummer (2005–2008) (Comedy)
Hamtaro (8 January 2004 – 18 December 2014) (Zomoroda)
Hanakappa (8 April 2018 – present) (Bon Bon)
Happy Ness: Secret of the Loch (31 March 2001 – 10 May 2008) (Adventure)
Helen the Baby Fox (Movies)
Hello Kitty's Paradise (2000–2010) (Zomoroda)
Hello! Sandybell (2000 – 23 February 2015) (Zomoroda)
Heroes of the City (2014–2017) (Bon Bon)
Hikarian (2002–2014) (Action)
Honoto Kuji Doge Danbei (2000 – 26 September 2016) (Sports)
Horseland (15 September 2006 – 30 September 2017; 11 March – 6 June 2019) (Zomoroda)
Horton Hears a Who! (2017) (Movies)
Hoyt'n Andy's Sportsbender (2003–2004) (Sports)
Hurricanes (28 April 2002 – 16 June 2007) (Sports)
Hunter × Hunter (1 September 2003 – 2020) (Adventure)
Hypernauts (2005–2009) (Adventure)
Ice Age: Continental Drift (2017–2019) (Movies)
Ice Age: The Meltdown (Movies)
Idaten Jump (15 June 2008 – 21 March 2015) (Sports)
Idol Densetsu Eriko (15 January 2006 – 29 May 2014) (Zomoroda)
Iftah Ya Simsim (4 September 2015 – 24 October 2019) (Abjad)
Ikkyū-san (2000–2013) (Adventure)
Inazuma Eleven (10 June 2010 – 2020) (Sports)
Information City (30 March 2004 – 6 March 2017; 2019) (Science then Abjad in 2019)
Inspector Fabre (2005 – 31 October 2013) (Adventure)
Inspector Gadget's Field Trip (6 August 2003 – 30 April 2017) (Science)
Inuyasha (21 November 2014 – 2020) (Adventure)
Ironfist Chinmi (15 March 2000 – 31 December 2020) (Sports)
Iron Kid (4 June 2007 – 23 February 2015) (Action)
Jankenman (2005–2020) (Bon Bon)
Jewelpet Twinkle (3 March 2013 – 18 December 2014) (Zomoroda)
Jewelpet (1 May 2011 – 31 October 2014) (Zomoroda)
Jim Henson's Animal Show (3 April 2000 – 16 June 2007) (Abjad)
Jungle Book Shonen Mowgli (2000 – 31 March 2015) (Adventure)
The Jungle King (Movies)
Justice League (2004–2012) (Action)
Kamen Rider: Dragon Knight (2013–2017) (Action)
Kamen Rider Ryuki (2007–2012) (Action)
Kamisama Minarai: Himitsu no Cocotama (2017–2020) (Zomoroda)
Keroro Gunsō (2010–2017) (Adventure)
The Kidsongs Television Show (2 March 2005 – 17 February 2017; 2019) (Abjad)
Kitty Cats (Abjad)
Kids Diana Show Ultimate Mishmash (22 March 2021 – present) (Zomoroda)
Kiteretsu Daihyakka (31 May 2003 – 10 March 2017) (Science)
Knowledge Quest (21 June 2000 – 14 June 2014) (Science)
Krypto the Superdog (10 February 2007 – 29 December 2011) (Adventure)
The Land Before Time (Movie)
The Land Before Time II: The Great Valley Adventure (Movie)
The Legend of the North Wind (2000–2013) (Adevnture)
The Legend of Snow White (2000–2014) (Zomoroda)
The Legend of Zorro (2000–2011) (Action)
Les Misérables: Shōjo Cosette (Adventure)
Let's Go Pocoyo (10 September 2018) (Abjad)
Liberty's Kids (3 February 2005 – 23 July 2018) (History then Adventure in 2013)
Life By the Numbers (17 June 2001 – 10 June 2017) (Science)
Little Bear (2000–2014) (Bon Bon)
Little Charmers (Zomoroda)
Little Clowns of Happytown (1 September 2004 – 31 August 2014) (Bon Bon)
Little Miss (English dubbed, Arabic subbed) (2015-2017) (Comedy)
Little Monsters (7 August 2002 – 22 May 2014) (Bon Bon)
Little People (6 September 2020 – present) (Bon Bon)
Little Robots (2007–2008) (Adventure)
Little Rosey (8 January 2004 – 16 November 2017) (Zomoroda)
Little Women II: Jo's Boys (18 February 2008 – 19 October 2017; 2020 (reruns)) (Zomoroda)
Littlest Pet Shop Shorts (6 September – 28 November 2020) (Zomoroda)
Littlest Pet Shop: A World of Our Own (Zomoroda) (7 December 2020 – present)
Looney Tunes (12 March 2001 – 18 November 2011) (Comedy)
The Lost Universe (2004–2013) (Adventure)
Machine Robo Rescue (2010–2015) (Action)
Macross (Action)
Madeline (12 March 2002 – 21 August 2018) (Zomoroda)
The Magic School Bus (14 April 2000 – 31 October 2013) (Abjad)
The Magic School Bus Rides Again (27 March 2022 – present) (Science)
Magical DoReMi (2006–2015) (Zomoroda)
Magical Princess Minky Momo (2000–2013) (Zomoroda)
Make Way for Noddy (31 May 2003 – 8 August 2016) (Bon Bon)
Mama is a 4th Grader (8 January 2004 – 24 December 2016) (Zomoroda)
Maple Town (2000–2013) (Bon Bon)
Maroons (2006–2011) (Bon Bon)
The Marshmallow Times (23 July 2007 – 21 August 2018) (Zomoroda)
Marvi Hämmer (19 January 2005 – 10 June 2017) (Science)
Masha and the Bear (2015–present) (Zomoroda)
Masha's Spooky Stories (6 September 2020 – present) (Zomoroda)
Masha's Tales (2015–2020) (Zomoroda)
The Mask (15 March 2000 – 21 October 2014) (Comedy)
The Masked Cycler (Action)
 The Mechnimals (13 January 2013) (Action)
Merrie Melodies (12 March 2001 – 18 November 2011) (Comedy)
Mia the Mouse (Abjad)
Mickey Mouse Clubhouse (2007) (Adventure)
Midori no Makibaō (11 January 2003 – 16 November 2013) (Comedy)
Mike the Knight (2015–2017) (Adventure)
Mobile Suit Gundam Wing (2003 – 31 October 2013) (Action)
Moero!! Robocon (14 March 2004 – 18 November 2016) (Adventure)
The Mojicons (2017–2020) (Adventure)
Molang (Comedy)
Monster Hunter Stories: Ride On (7 September 2020 – present) (Action)
Monster Jam (Sports)
Monster Rancher (2003 – 12 September 2014) (Action)
Moonzy (Abjad)
Mortal Kombat: Defenders of the Realm (2000–2012) (Action)
The Moshaya Family (4 January 2021 – present)  (Adventure)
The Mr. Men Show  (17 August 2015 – 2017) (UK English dub with Arabic subtitles); (Season 1: 20 September 2020 – 7 September 2021; 13 February 2022 – present) (Arabic dub) (Comedy)
¡Mucha Lucha! (23 July 2004 – 4 January 2013) (Comedy)
Muka Muka Paradise (2000 – 31 May 2020) (Bon Bon)
My Favorite Martians (31 July 2000 – 12 May 2014) (Comedy)
My Little Pony: Equestria Girls (Zomoroda)
My Little Pony: Friendship Is Magic (15 June 2014 – 2020; formerly aired on Cartoon Network Arabic) (Zomoroda)
My Little Pony: Pony Life (22 March 2021 – present) (Zomoroda)
My Long Legged Dad (2003) (Zomoroda)
Nadia: The Secret of Blue Water (2000–2013) (Adventure)
Naruto (25 August 2007 – 2020) (Action)
Naruto SD (16 April 2015 – 2019) (Comedy) (first 25 episodes only, new episodes on Yemen TV)
The New Adventures of Flash Gordon (Action)
The New Adventures of Zorro (2000 – 14 May 2008) (Action)
Net Ghost PiPoPa (Adventure)
NG Knight Ramune & 40 (2005–2012) (Action)
Nontan (13 July 2000 – 2020) (Bon Bon)
Odin: Photon Sailer Starlight (Movie)
Offside (1 March 2006 – 1 February 2015) (Sports)
Ojamajo Doremi (15 February 2006 – 15 November 2015) (Season 1 – 2 – 3, Zomoroda)
Once Upon a Forest (10 November 2017) (Movies)
Once Upon a Time... The Explorers (2000–2005) (History)
One Piece (8 March 2008 – 2020) (Adventure)
Operation Ouch! (12 September 2021 – present) (Science)
Opti-Morphs (2017–2019) (Action)
Pandalian (2010–2018) (Adventure)
Pappyland (19 September 2000 – 25 December 2016) (Abjad)
Peacemaker Kurogane (1 May 2011 – 2020) (Adventure)
Peanuts (13 May 2000 – 11 April 2014) (Bon Bon)
Phantom 2040 (12 September 2000 – 24 September 2013) (Action)
The Pink Panther (14 September 2000 – 24 July 2007) (Comedy)
The Pink Panther Show (14 June 2014 – 9 September 2017) (Comedy)
Pink Panther and Sons (2018) (Comedy)
Pinky and the Brain (6 May 2002 – 9 December 2011) (Comedy)
Pippi Longstocking (26 October 2003 – 8 April 2014) (Zomoroda)
Pocoyo (Abjad)
Pokémon (Action)
Police Academy (14 April 2000 – 19 December 2014) (Comedy)
Popeye and Son (2008) (Adventure)
Popples (3 September 2018 – present) (Zomoroda)
Pound Puppies (2000 – 26 October 2013) (Bon Bon)
The Powerpuff Girls (23 July 2004 – 11 April 2008) (Zomoroda)
Power Rangers (Action)
Princess Castle (Movies)
Princess Sarah (2000–2016) (Zomoroda)
ProStars (27 August 2000 – 24 July 2007) (Sports)
The Rainbow Fish (Movies)
Rainbow Fish (4 April 2002 – 12 September 2018) (Bon Bon)
Rainbow Ruby (2018) (Zomoroda)
Ranma ½ (12 January 2011 – 12 December 2016) (Adventure)
The Real Adventures of Jonny Quest (27 May 2000 – 24 July 2007) (Action)
Remi, Nobody's Girl (2000–2016) (Zomoroda)
Rescue Heroes (2005 – 6 December 2005) (Action)
Rescue Squad (2005) (Bon Bon)
Rev & Roll (7 September 2020 – present) (Adventure)
Ricky Zoom (Adventure)
Road Rovers (2003 – 16 June 2007) (Action)
Robots (Movies)
Rolie Polie Olie (30 June 2004 – 30 March 2012) (Bonbona)
Romeo's Blue Skies (2000 – 10 September 2017) (Adventure)
Roofters (Bon Bon)
Rubbadubbers (15 May – 20 November 2007) (Adventure)
Rupert (2000–2014) (Bon Bon)
Ryan's Mystery Playdate (Adventure)
Samurai Jack (25 March 2005 – 15 May 2009) (Adventure)
Samurai 7 (2009–2020) (Action)
Sangokushi (2000 – 21 October 2020) (History then Adventure in 2013)
Scan2Go (2012–2014) (Sports)
Scooby-Doo (all incarnations up until What's New Scooby-Doo?) (27 June 2000 – 22 April 2009) (Comedy)
Secret of Cerulean Sand (2006–2015) (Zomoroda)
The Secret Garden (2000–2016) (Zomoroda)
Secret Life of Toys (2000–2015) (Bon Bon)
The Secret Lives of Waldo Kitty (Adventure)
Secret Millionaires Club (12 March 2022 – present) (Science)
Sheep in the Big City (2007–2008) (Comedy)
Shelley Duvall's Bedtime Stories (2005–2013) (Movies)
Shin Hakkenden (2003–2017) (Action)
Silverwing (Movies)
Simba, The King Lion (2000 – 30 March 2012) (Adventure)
Sitting Ducks (16 May 2004 – 26 September 2014) (Comedy)
Slam Dunk (2000 – 26 November 2015) (Sports)
The Smurfs (1981) (26 July 2000 – 16 December 2007) (Adventure)
The Smurfs (2021) (3 July 2022 – present) (Adventure)
Snorks (19 July 2003 – 18 December 2006) (Adventure)
Sonic Boom (20 November 2017 – 7 February 2019) (formerly aired on Cartoon Network Arabic) (Adventure)
Sonic the Hedgehog (12 January 2005 – 21 February 2015) (Adventure)
Space Ranger Roger (4 April 2021 – present) (Adventure)
Space Warrior Baldios (2006–2015) (Action)
Space Toon Interactive Game (19 January 2005 – 21 May 2009) (Science)
Special Armored Battalion Dorvack (2006–2015) (Action)
The Spooktacular New Adventures of Casper (2002 – 9 December 2011) (Comedy)
Stickin' Around (10 April 2006 – 24 September 2013) (Comedy)
Stone Protectors (2003 – 31 March 2015) (Action)
The Story of Cinderella (2000–2014) (Zomoroda)
Strange Dawn (2003 – 21 October 2016) (Action)
Strawberry Shortcake (2003) (1 April 2005 – 10 December 2014) (Zomoroda)
Street Fighter (2000–2014) (Action)
Street Sharks (2000 – 14 December 2011) (Action)
Super Dave: Daredevil for Hire (2001–2013) (Comedy)
The Super Dimension Fortress Macross  (2006–2015) (Acton)
Super Duper Sumos (15 June 2003 – 23 October 2013) (Comedy)
Super Little Fanta Heroes (2001–2011) (History)
Super Mario World (23 July 2000 – 12 September 2014) (Adventure)
Super Wings (2017–present) (Adventure)
Super Yo-Yo (14 March 2004 – 27 August 2016) (Action)
Superman: The Animated Series (13 June 2000 – 10 October 2012) (Action)
Superhuman Samurai Syber-Squad (12 January 2005 – 2008) (Adventure)
SWAT Kats: The Radical Squadron (2000–2004) (Action)
The Sword and the Chess of Death (1 August 2018 – 2021) (History)
The Swiss Family Robinson: Flone of the Mysterious Island (Adventure)
The Sylvester & Tweety Mysteries (4 March 2002 – 22 April 2009) (Comedy)
The New Woody Woodpecker Show (2001–2013) (Comedy)
Tama and Friends (27 July 2000 – 26 July 2016; 2018–2020) (Bon Bon)
Tanoshii Willow Town (2000–2015) (Bon Bon)
Taz-Mania (1 March 2002 – 8 October 2010) (Comedy)
Teenage Mutant Ninja Turtles (1987) (27 March 2000 – 31 December 2003) (Action)
Teenage Mutant Ninja Turtles (2003) (24 February 2005 – 1 January 2011) (Action)
Tekken Chinmi Legends (10 July 2000 – 30 November 2016; 5 July – 15 September 2020) (reruns) (Sports)
Teletubbies (1997) (1 April 2005 – 1 January 2011) (Abjad)
Teletubbies (2015) (Season 1 Part 1: 9 October 2017 – 12 February 2020; 22 June 2020 – 2021) (Season 1 Part 2: 18 September 2022 – present) (Bon Bon)
Thomas & Friends: Sodor's Legend of the Lost Treasure (Movies)
Thomas & Friends (7 September 2015 – present) (Bon Bon)
Thomas & Friends: Tale of the Brave (Movies)
Thunder Jet  (31 March 2000 – 21 October 2020) (Action)
The Tom and Jerry Comedy Show (1 March 2002 – 14 June 2014) (Comedy)
The Tom and Jerry Show (1 March 2002 – 14 June 2014) (Comedy)
Tico & Friends (2000 – 23 February 2015) (Adventure) 
Tig & Leo (7 September 2020 – present) (Adventure)
Tiger Mask (2000 – 27 September 2016) (Action then Sport in 2013)
Tiny Toon Adventures (5 April 2003 – 2 December 2011) (Comedy)
Titeuf (7 April – 16 December 2007) (Comedy)
The Tom and Jerry Kids Show (13 July 2000 – 31 December 2005) (Comedy)
Tom and Jerry (5 April 2001 – 4 April 2015) (Comedy)
Tommy and Oscar (8 June 2001 – 16 June 2008) (Adventure)
Topo Gigio (1 September 2000 – 15 April 2014) (Adventure)
Toy Toons (Bon Bon)
Transformers: Cyberverse (22 March 2020 – present) (Action)
Transformers: Rescue Bots Academy (8 March 2021 – present) (Adventure)
Trapp Family Story (1 May 2001 – 8 January 2015) (Zomoroda)
Treasure Island (1978 TV series) (12 September 2000 – 12 November 2013) (Adventure)
True and the Rainbow Kingdom (16 October 2021 – present) (Zomoroda)
Trucktown (4 April 2016 – 16 July 2017; 2020–present) (Adventure)
Tsurikichi Sanpei (2000 – 10 October 2020) (Adventure)
Tsuyoshi Shikkari Shinasai (1 June 2007 – 10 October 2020) (Adventure)
The Twisted Tales of Felix the Cat (2002 – 24 July 2007) (Adventure)
Ultraforce (2000 – 31 October 2014) (Action)
Vehicle Kingdom Boo Boo Can Kang (2006–2013) (Bon Bon)
Virtua Fighter (2004 – 26 September 2016) (Action)
Voltron: The Third Dimension (2000–2012) (Action)
Votexity (2018–present) (Sports)
The Wacky World of Tex Avery (10 February 2007 – 1 September 2017) (Comedy)
Wayside (2017–2018; 2019) (Comedy)
What-a-Mess (17 May 2004 – 27 September 2014) (Comedy)
Where on Earth Is Carmen Sandiego? (2007–2013) (Adventure)
Wild West C.O.W.-Boys of Moo Mesa (28 April 2004 – 22 May 2008) (Action)
Wing Commander Academy (2003–2012) (Action)
Wish Kid (15 August 2004 – 14 August 2014) (Adventure)
World Famous Tales (15 July 2005 – 23 April 2016) (History then Adventure in 2013)
Xiaolin Showdown (2007–2008) (Action)
Yo-kai Watch (12 September 2016 – 26 July 2018) (Adventure)
Yo Yogi! (2000–2011) (Comedy)
Yogi's Treasure Hunt (2000–2008) (Comedy)
Zafari (February 2019) (Adventure)
Zak Storm (10 September 2018) (Adventure)
Zak Tales (2006–2013) (Bon Bon)

Spacetoon English (2005–2011)

Former programming
Animaniacs (Comedy)
Anatole (Bon Bon)
Babar (Bon Bon)
Dexter's Laboratory (Comedy)
Franklin (Alpha)
Inspector Gadget's Field Trip (Science)
Jim Henson's Animal Show (Science)
The Powerpuff Girls (Zomoroda)
Mickey Mouse Clubhouse (Bon Bon)
¡Mucha Lucha! (Comedy)
Rolie Polie Olie (Bon Bon)
Sonic the Hedgehog (Adventure)
The Tom and Jerry Comedy Show (Comedy)
Tom & Jerry Kids (Comedy)

Spacetoon Indonesia

Current and former programming
Franklin and Friends (Bon Bon)
Pretty Cure (Zomoroda)
Dragon Ball GT (Action)
One Piece (Adventure)
Pleasant Goat (Sports)
Hamtaro (Zomoroda)
Oggy and the Cockroaches (Comedy)
Ronaldinho Gaucho's Team (Sports)
Detective Conan (Action)
Princess Knight (Zomoroda)
Monster High (Zomoroda)
Ever After High (Zomoroda)
Enchantimals: Tales from Everwilde (Zomoroda)
The Cramp Twins (Comedy)
Angela Anaconda (Comedy)
Zombie Hotel (Comedy)
Zenderman (Comedy)
Weird-Oh's (Comedy)
Pecola (Comedy)
Rayman: The Animated Series (Comedy)
Wishfart (Comedy) (16 July 2018 – present)
The ZhuZhus (Comedy) (13 May 2019 – present)
Super Yo-Yo (Action)
Tama and Friends (Bon Bon)
Kidsongs (Alpha)
Snoopy's Reunion (Movies)
Mother Goose and Grimm (Comedy)
Tiny Planet (Alpha)
Once Upon a Time... The Explorers (History)
Hungry Heart: Wild Striker (Sports)
Yu-Gi-Oh! (2007–2009) (Action)
Bakusō Kyōdai Let's & Go!! (2005–2010, 2012) (Sports)
The Road Runner Show (29 July 2017) (Comedy)
Mach Go Go Go (Sports)
Princess Comet (2007–2011) (Zomoroda)
Pat & Mat (Bon Bon)
Kipper (Bon Bon)
The Fixies (Science)
Cyberchase (Science)
Scaredy Squirrel (Comedy)
Baby & Me (Adventure)
Time Bokan (Adventure)
Yatterman (Adventure)
Ferdy The Ant (Adventure)
Peter Pan & the Pirates (Adventure)
Daigunder (Action)
Ninja Hattori-kun (Comedy)
Pink Panther and Sons (14 September 2017 – present) (Comedy)
Honeybee Hutch (1989) (14 September 2017 – present) (Adventure)
Pingu (October 2017) (Bon Bon)
The Song of Tentomushi (Comedy)
Tennessee Tuxedo and His Tales (Comedy)
Votexity (Sports)
Akakichi no Eleven (Sports)
Princess Castle (Movies)
Pinocchio: The Series (History)
Clay Kids (Comedy)
The Amazing 3 (Science)
Dan Doh!! (Sports)
Honō no Dōkyūji: Dodge Danpei (Sports)
Gatchaman (Action)
Batman: The Animated Series (Action)
Judo Boy (Action)
Superman: The Animated Series (Action)
Trouble Chocolate (Zomoroda)
Corrector Yui (Zomoroda)
Hikari no Densetsu (Sports)
XX Bom Swirl Fighter (Sports)
Dragon League (Sports)
Bernard (Comedy)
Histeria! (Comedy)
Kobo Chan (Comedy)
Adventures of Sonic the Hedgehog (10 April 2017) (Comedy)
Rahan (13 April 2017) (Adventure)
Dharma For Kids (Alpha)
The Jungle King (Movies)
Miss Spider's Sunny Patch Friends (Bon Bon)
DuckTales (Bon Bon)
Shimmer's Bowtique (Bon Bon)
Rolie Polie Olie (Bon Bon)
The Magic School Bus (Alpha)
Code Lyoko (Action)
Let's and Go (Sports)
Web driver (sports)

Spacetoon South Korea

Former programming
Tico of the Seven Seas (Adventure)
Romeo's Blue Skies (Adventure)
Hikarian: Great Railroad Protector (Action)
B-Robo Kabutack (Action)
Little Women II: Jo's Boys (Zomoroda)
Persia, the Magic Fairy (Zomoroda)
Pastel Yumi, the Magic Idol (Zomoroda)
Captain Tsubasa (Sports)
Offside (Sports)
Bakusō Kyōdai Let's & Go!! (Sports)
Dragon League (Sports)
Blazing Teens (Sports)
Bob The Builder (Bon Bon)
Bubu Chacha (Bon Bon)
Teletubbies (Bon Bon)
Tweenies (Bon Bon)
Little People (Alpha)
Pecola (Comedy)
Oggy and the Cockroaches (season 1) (Comedy Planet)
Sangokushi (History)
Teenage Mutant Ninja Turtles (2003) (Action)

Spacetoon Pakistan

Original series
Burka Avenger
Chaplin & Co

Current programming
8 Man
Adventures from the Book of Virtues
The Adventures of Super Mario Bros. 3
Blaze and the Monster Machines
Chuang Tapestry
City of Friends
The Crew
F-Zero
Falcon Island
Fist of the North Star
Fix & Foxi and Friends
Horseland
Hurricanes
Kids Incorporated
Kidsongs
Lady!!
Make Way for Noddy
Manmaru the Ninja Penguin
Monkey Turn
Odin: Photon Sailer Starlight
Offside
Pingu
ProStars
Rainbow Fish
Rat-A-Tat
The Recruit
Robotech
Rosie and Jim
Romeo's Blue Skies
Stickin' Around
Super Mario World
Numb Chucks

Upcoming programming
The New Adventures of Kimba The White Lion
Rayman
The Wild Adventures of Blinky Bill
Skylanders Academy
The Avengers: Earth's Mightiest Heroes
Pretty Cure Max Heart
Sailor Moon Sailor Stars
Bing
Angry Birds Toons
The Wacky World Of Tex Avery
Cat & Keet
Speed Racer: The Next Generation
Initial D
AI Football GGO
Whistle!
The Tale of Despereaux

Spacetoon India

Action Man
Auto Cat  (Cyborg Kuro Chan)
Baby & Me
Barney & Friends
Bump in the Night
Crush Gear
Hello Kitty
Incredible Dennis
Inspector Faber
Inspector Gadget's Field Trip
Little Clowns of Happytown
Lost Universe

Plusters
Ryukendo
Fafa & Juno
Sherlock Holmes
Sitting Ducks
Princess Sarah (2000–2016) (Zomoroda)
ProStars (27 August 2000 – 4 June 2004) (Adventure)
Simba, The King Lion
Sonic the Hedgehog
Super Litte Fanta Heroes
The Great Book of Nature
Toy Toons
Wild West C.O.W.-Boys of Moo Mesa
Willow Town
Floral Magician Mary Bell
The blue power
Teenage Mutant Ninja Turtles (2003)

References

Spacetoon
Anime television
Spacetoon